Cheng Chih-lung (born 29 August 1969) is a Taiwanese basketball coach and retired basketball player, as well as a former politician as a member of the Legislative Yuan of the Republic of China.

Cheng played small forward for the Chinese Taipei national basketball team and started as shooting guard for his professional clubs in Taiwan's Chinese Basketball Alliance and mainland China's Chinese Basketball Association mostly in the last decade of the 20th century. During his prime, he was widely recognized as one of the best offensive players in Asia. He was also the first Taiwanese player to play in the Chinese Basketball Association. After a brief but controversy-packed political career following his retirement as a player in 2001, Cheng has returned to basketball to coach in Taiwan's Super Basketball League since 2007. (He also coached in China's National Basketball League in 2012.)

Early life
Cheng's biological father returned to the United States before Cheng was born. He was raised by his mother, of Amis descent.

Playing career
As a member of the Chinese Taipei youth team, teen-aged Cheng Chih-lung was two-time scoring champion in the FIBA's Under-18 Asian Championship. At the age of 19, he became the then-youngest player on the Chinese Taipei adult team and helped his team to a third-place finish in FIBA Asia Championship 1989—Taiwan's best record in the tournament since its resumption of international sports participation in the mid-1980s. From then through 1999, Cheng played for the national team in various international tournaments and helped set the team's best records in all major tournaments in the region including winning Taiwan's first gold medal in men's basketball in the 1997 East Asian Games. As the representative star player of Taiwan, Cheng was selected to All-Tournament Team for the William Jones Cup international tournament for numerous times and to the FIBA Asian All-Star roster in 1998.

Initially nicknamed "Doctor" after Dr. J by his American coach, John Nealon, due to his jumping ability, Cheng Chih-lung subsequently derived another nickname, "the Loach-Dragon" (泥鰍龍), from his shrewd playing style. A stable mid- and long range shooter, Cheng was also acclaimed for his smart offensive running, crafty moves, and great body coordination in the air that enabled him to "bore" through the defense like a slippery dojo loach and score from various angles and distances. As a Hung Kuo Elephant, he became the then-highest-paid basketball player in Taiwan and was the cornerstone of the "Hung Kuo dynasty" from 1996 through 1998 when the team won three consecutive championships of Taiwan's professional Chinese Basketball Alliance (中華職業籃球聯盟). He was named the most valuable player (MVP) for the 1995–1996 season and for the 1998 championship series where he almost single-handedly brought his team to its third title out of a 1-3 plight in the best-of-seven series against the powerful challenger, the Kaohsiung Mars.

After the Taiwanese professional league, as well as his home club, the Hung Kuo Elephants, came to disbandment due to financial difficulties in 1999, Cheng moved to play for the Shanghai Sharks of the Chinese Basketball Association in mainland China. Teamed up with the then-adolescent Yao Ming, Cheng helped the young Sharks advance to the finals for the first time in franchise history before they were defeated by the nearly invincible Bayi Rockets. First Taiwanese player to join the top-tier Chinese league, Cheng was selected to play in the postseason all-star game and received the league's sporting ethics award. After one rather successful season in China, Cheng returned to Taiwan to play for Dacin Tigers in the amateur Division-A conference (甲組聯賽) where he ended his playing career in the following year (2001).

After retirement as a player
Under the arrangement of his sponsor Wang Jen-ta (王人達), the then-president of the executive board of the Republic of China Basketball Association (中華民國籃球協會) and a political ally of James Soong, Cheng Chih-lung ran for and won the 2001 legislative election as the People First Party (PFP) nominee in the first district of Taipei County. His political career, however, was overshadowed by the scandal of extramarital affair with legislative colleague Kao Chin Su-mei, and public censures for inaction.

In the capacity of legislator, nevertheless, Cheng Chih-lung was given the credit of working with the government's Sports Affairs Council to give birth to the Super Basketball League, which started to function in 2003. In the fifth season of the league's existence, Cheng Chih-lung accepted the commission to coach Taiwan Mobile Clouded Leopards and brought the losing team to an improved 15–15 record in the 2009–2010 season.

References
 http://www.taiwanhoops.com/1999/10/taiwan-star-cheng-chih-lung-to-play-in.html
 http://www.chinapost.com.tw/taiwan/local/taipei/2011/05/25/303629/Basketball-star.htm

Living people
Taiwanese men's basketball players
Members of the 5th Legislative Yuan
1969 births
New Taipei Members of the Legislative Yuan
People First Party Members of the Legislative Yuan
Taiwanese basketball coaches
Shooting guards
Small forwards
Shanghai Sharks players
Amis people
Taiwanese people of American descent
Taiwanese sportsperson-politicians
Chinese Culture University alumni
Taiwanese expatriate basketball people in China
Taiwanese politicians of indigenous descent
Taoyuan Pilots head coaches
Chinese Taipei men's national basketball team players
Dacin Tigers players
Chinese Taipei men's national basketball team coaches
Hung Kuo basketball players
Chinese Basketball Alliance players
McDonald's basketball players